USCGC Raritan (WYT-93/WYTM-93) was a United States Coast Guard  harbor tug that was in service from 1939 to 1988. She served on the Greenland Patrol during World War II and after the war on the Great Lakes. From 1980 until decommissioning she was homeported at Governors Island.

Construction
Raritan was built for the Coast Guard by Defoe Boat Works, Bay City, Michigan, at a cost of 309,000 and was launched alongside her sister cutter  on 23 March 1939, the first dual launching to ever take place in Bay City. She was one of four Arundel-type 110 foot light icebreaking tugs built in 1939, the design of which was taken from  the successful 1934 Calumet-type 110 foot tug design. After commissioning on 11 April 1939, she was assigned harbor duties at Boston, Massachusetts.

History

World War II
Germany invaded Denmark on 9 April 1940 and then laid claim to Denmark's crown colony, Greenland. The U.S. State Department immediately began negotiations with Henrik Kauffmann, the Danish government-in-exile representative in Washington, D.C. and Eske Brun, the Governor of Greenland to preserve Greenland's sovereignty. An agreement was reached on 3 May where Greenland requested U.S. protection. Because of the Coast Guard's experience with the International Ice Patrol and because it operated the only ships that were equipped to handle ice conditions in Greenland waters, the State Department requested Coast Guard assistance in enforcing claims of sovereignty and to prevent Germany from taking control of the cryolite mines at Ivittuut and establishing weather stations on the Eastern coastline.

Raritan was transferred to U.S. Navy control on 1 November 1941 by Executive Order 8929 which transferred the entire Coast Guard from the United States Department of the Treasury to the United States Navy. Raritan continued to be homeported at Boston under U.S. Navy control but was manned by Coast Guard personnel.

Post-war service

After the Coast Guard was returned to the Treasury Department on 1 January 1946 in accordance with Executive Order 9666, Raritan continued to operate in Boston Harbor. She subsequently was transferred to Portsmouth, Virginia. and in 1962 she was assigned to the Great Lakes and her home port was Grand Haven, Michigan.

Raritan was decommissioned from Coast Guard service on 14 May 1988.

Notes

Footnotes

Citations

References used

 
 
 
 

Ships of the United States Coast Guard
1939 ships
World War II auxiliary ships of the United States
Tugs of the United States Navy
Ships built in Bay City, Michigan
Arundel-class tugs